Sivanthipuram is a panchayat town in Tirunelveli district in the Indian state of Tamil Nadu.

Demographics
At the 2001 India census, Sivanthipuram had a population of 13,650 (49% male, 51% female). Sivanthipuram had an average literacy rate of 81%, higher than the national average of 59.5%: male literacy was 85% and female literacy 77%. 9% of the population were under 6 years of age.

The nearest railway station is at Ambasamudram, .

References

Cities and towns in Tirunelveli district